East Kessler Park is a residential neighborhood in Kessler, Dallas, Texas (United States). It is bounded by Interstate 30 to the north, West Colorado Boulevard to the south, North Beckley Avenue to the east, Sylvan Avenue and the Kessler Park neighborhood to the west. Methodist Dallas Medical Center, built in 1927 on land donated by the Stemmons family, anchors the southeast corner of the neighborhood. The hilly geography along with the doctors living in the neighborhood explains the area's informal designation, "Pill Hill". The houses were constructed for the most part in the 1950s, with many examples of brick, Mid-Century Modern architecture. The yards are the largest in the Kessler area.

Neighborhoods in Dallas